Herbert Westfaling (3 January 1630 – 1705) was an English politician who sat in the House of Commons  in 1660.

Westfaling was the son of Herbert Westfaling of Mansell Gamage and his wife Elizabeth Frogmore, daughter of John Frogmore of Claines, Herefordshire.

In 1660, Westfaling was elected Member of Parliament for Hereford in the Convention Parliament. In 1661 he fought a highly contentious election for the Cavalier Parliament. Sir Henry Lingen, the other member, sought to replace Westfaling by his friend Sir Edward Hopton and gained control of the corporation before the royalist councillors were restored. The mayor created 80 freemen from Lingen's supporters and refused to do likewise for Westfaling. Lingen was returned unopposed, but Westfaling demanded a poll against Hopton. The mayor was detained in the Guild Hall on the first day and refused to go to the poll on the second day, declaring Hopton elected from Hopton's House. Westfaling persuaded the sheriff to take another return and Hopton topped the poll but with what turned out to be a number of invalid votes. Hopton was allowed to sit but the matter was referred to the elections committee. Sir Job Charlton noted that "there was a very strange carriage and some disturbance in the elections" and recommended Hopton be unseated. However parliament  declared the election void, and Lingen and Westfaling were returned at the by-election. Westfaling sat until 1679.

Westfaling was mayor of Hereford in 1683.

Westfaling died at the age of 75.

Westfaling married Ann Edwards daughter of Sir Thomas Edwards.

References

1630 births
1705 deaths
English MPs 1660
Mayors of Hereford
English MPs 1661–1679